Uncle Wiggily Longears is the main character of a series of children's stories by American author Howard R. Garis. He began writing the stories for the Newark News in 1910. Garis penned an Uncle Wiggily story every day (except Sundays) for more than 52 years, and published 79 books in his lifetime. According to his obituary in the Chicago Tribune, a walk in the woods in Verona, New Jersey was his inspiration. The books featured work by several illustrators, notably Lansing Campbell. Other illustrators of the series included George L. Carlson, Louis Wisa, Elmer Rache, Edward Bloomfield, Lang Campbell, and Mary and Wallace Stover.

Characters and stories
Uncle Wiggily, an engaging elderly rabbit, is lame from rheumatism. Wherever he goes, he always relies on a red, white, and blue crutch—described as being "striped like a barber-pole", or, in later episodes, "his candy-striped walking cane", with spiral red and white striping like a peppermint candy stick.

Uncle Wiggily is only one of many recurring characters in the series. For example, the Pipsisewah is an unsavory bully who appears as a rhinoceros-like creature. His head has a snout with two small horns and large, snorting nostrils; he wears a black, conical cloth hat and patched scarlet trousers, is stout with a giraffe-skin body and bovine tail, and walks upright on two legs. As do the other characters, he has hands, but boar's hooves for feet. He is normally accompanied by the crow-like Skeezicks, in his tall red cap and red-and-yellow-striped suit, and the two of them rarely engage in anything other than mischief harmless to the other characters in the storyline. The Bazumpus, the Crozokus, and the Scuttlemagoon appear less frequently, but are just as outlandish as the aforementioned "Pip" and "Skee", and always require appropriate "handling" by Uncle Wiggily—often with the aid of his animal friends.

There are also several other "bad chaps" in the stories: the Woozy Wolf, Bushy Bear, Skillery Skallery Alligator and the fierce Bobcat, to name but a few. They all seem bent on nibbling the "souse" off Uncle Wiggily's ears, but he always escapes. In shorter, more formulaic stories, his escape is generally enabled by some implement he has just purchased at the store—often while on an errand for his muskrat housekeeper, Nurse Jane Fuzzy Wuzzy. For example, Uncle Wiggily once used an umbrella to foil the Skillery Skallery Alligator by thrusting it into the creature's mouth and opening it, thus preventing his biting the old gentleman rabbit.

Uncle Wiggily also encounters amicable animal characters from his neighborhood, such as Sammie and Susie Littletail (Uncle Wiggily's young nephew and niece); Lulu, Alice, and Jimmie Wibblewobble (duck children); Dr. Possum (local physician); Uncle Butter (goat); Charlie and Arabella Chick; Jackie and Peetie Bow-Wow; Billie and Johnnie Bushytail (squirrel boys); Joie, Tommie, and Kittie Kat; Jennie Chipmunk; Munchie Trot (pony boy); Dottie and Willie Lambkin; Neddie and Beckie Stubtail (friendly bear cubs); as well as many others. In shorter stories, we frequently find Uncle Wiggily helping various of these friends out of some kind of predicament just before one of the bad chaps enters the picture, intent on obtaining "ear-nibbles" from their hapless victims. In longer stories, Uncle Wiggily often is off on a camping trip or other extended journey with one of his friends, fending off repeated incursions or baffling mean-spirited pranks from a lurking villain or two—not uncommonly with the aid of his crutch or a "thing-a-ma-bob" he happens to have brought along in his satchel.

Selected bibliography

Howard Garis published 79 books of Uncle Wiggily stories. A few of these included:

 Uncle Wiggily's Adventures (1912)
 Uncle Wiggily's Travels (copyright 1913)
 Uncle Wiggily's Fortune (copyright 1913)
 Uncle Wiggily's Automobile (copyright 1913)
 Uncle Wiggily's Airship (copyright 1915)
 Uncle Wiggily in the Country (copyright 1916)
 Uncle Wiggily on the Farm (copyright 1918)
 Uncle Wiggily's Empty Watch (copyright 1919) — three short stories
 Uncle Wiggily's Fishing Trip (copyright 1919) — three short stories
 Uncle Wiggily Goes Swimming (copyright 1919) — three short stories
 Uncle Wiggily Indian Hunter (copyright 1919) — three short stories
 Uncle Wiggily's Holidays (copyright 1919) — three short stories
 Uncle Wiggily in Fairyland (Uncle Wiggily Arabian Nights) (copyright 1922)
 Uncle Wiggily Book (copyright 1927) — published as a school reading book
 Uncle Wiggily and Friends (copyright 1939)
 Uncle Wiggily and the Littletails (copyright 1942)
 Uncle Wiggily's Happy Days (copyright 1947)
 Uncle Wiggily and Jackie and Peetie Bow Wow (copyright 1952)
 Uncle Wiggily at the Seashore
 Uncle Wiggily's Story Book
 Uncle Wiggily's Picture Book
 Uncle Wiggily and the Turkey Gobbler — three short stories
 Uncle Wiggily's Water Spout — three short stories

Picture Books with Lang Cambell 

Howard Garis published 32 picture books of Uncle Wiggily stories with Lang Cambell.  Each contains three stories, the title story and two more:

 Uncle Wiggily’s Auto Sled
 Uncle Wiggily’s Snow Man
 Uncle Wiggily’s Holidays
 Uncle Wiggily’s Apple Roast
 Uncle Wiggily’s Picnic
 Uncle Wiggily’s Fishing Trip
 Uncle Wiggily’s June Bug Friends
 Uncle Wiggily’s Visit To The Farm
 Uncle Wiggily’s Silk Hat
 Uncle Wiggily, Indian Hunter
 Uncle Wiggily’s Ice Cream Party
 Uncle Wiggily’s Woodland Games
 Uncle Wiggily On The Flying Rug
 Uncle Wiggily At The Beach
 Uncle Wiggily And The Pirates
 Uncle Wiggily’s Funny Auto
 Uncle Wiggily On Roller Skates
 Uncle Wiggily Goes Swimming
 Uncle Wiggily’s Water Spout
 Uncle Wiggily’s Laughing Gas Balloons
 Uncle Wiggily’s Empty Watch
 Uncle Wiggily’s Radio
 Uncle Wiggily And The Beaver Boys
 Uncle Wiggily And The Turkey Gobbler
 Uncle Wiggily’s Squirt Gun (1919)
 Uncle Wiggily And The Alligator
 Uncle Wiggily’s Washtub Ship
 Uncle Wiggily’s Rolling Hoop
 Uncle Wiggily’s Make Believe Tarts
 Uncle Wiggily’s Ice Boat
 Uncle Wiggily’s Jumping Boots
 Uncle Wiggily’s Icicle Spear

In popular culture
Uncle Wiggley was the name of a small skateboard company from 1984 to 1990 known for using "epoxyglass" in their skateboard manufacturing. In addition to making their own products, they also made skateboards decks for Losi, Blockhead, SGI, Magnusson Designs, Steadham Designs, and even early H-Street decks. Sponsored professionals included Tony Magnusson (who was a part-owner) and John Schultes.

Uncle Wiggly was a 1990s era rock band.

Uncle Wiggly's is also the name of a Baltimore-based chain of ice cream shops.

A two-part song regarding Uncle Wiggily is on Tourniquet's albums Pathogenic Ocular Dissonance ("The Skeezix Dilemma") and Microscopic View of a Telescopic Realm ("The Skeezix Dilemma Part II").

The Book Uncle Wiggily and His Friends has a brief appearance in the 1994 film Forrest Gump, being read by Jenny while Forrest "dangles" (at 14 Minutes and 56 Seconds in).

On the September 4, 2013, episode of Late Night with Jimmy Fallon, Uncle Wiggly's Rheumatism book was on the "Do Not Read List" skit.

Uncle Wiggily appears as a reference between the two characters, Eloise and Walt, in Uncle Wiggily in Connecticut - one of the nine short stories in J.D. Salinger's collection of short stories, 'Nine Stories'. Specifically, the story's title refers to an event recalled by Eloise in which she and Walt were running to catch a bus and she sprains her ankle. Walt then says, referring to her ankle in good humor, "Poor Uncle Wiggily...".

In 1987 Uncle Wiggily was referred to in a "rock music fable" called "Little Boy Goes to Hell" a four-record set by Mark Nichols (composer) released on PopLlama Records. The song is titled "Your Deepest Fear".

See also

 Uncle Wiggily (board game)
 "Uncle Wiggily in Connecticut", a short story by J.D. Salinger

References

External links
 
 
 Uncle Wiggily stories at LibriVox (public domain audiobooks)
 As a webcomic, set in modern times: Uncle Wiggily's Travels

20th-century children's literature
American children's books
Series of children's books
Books about rabbits and hares
Fictional rabbits and hares
Male characters in literature
Literary characters introduced in 1910